Frank Paul Sauerwein (1871-1910) was an American painter of the American West.

Further reading

References

1871 births
1910 deaths
American male painters
Artists of the American West
19th-century American painters
19th-century American male artists
20th-century American painters
20th-century American male artists